Saiin may refer to:

 Saiin (priestess), female relatives of the Emperor of Japan who served at Kamo Shrine
 Saiin Station, Hankyu Kyoto line train station
 Sai-in Temple (Nara), the western structure of the greater Hōryū-ji complex in Nara